Lown is a surname. Notable people with the surname include: 

Bernard Lown (born 1921), American developer of the direct current defibrillator and the cardioverter, founder of the Lown Institute
Bert Lown (1903–1962), American violinist, orchestra leader, and songwriter
George H. Lown, American politician
Misty Lown, American dance teacher
Peter Lown (born 1947), Canadian field hockey player
Thomas Lown (1904–1977), American boxer
Turk Lown (1924–2016), American baseball player